Eric Hugh Peter Merriman (6 December 1924 – 2 June 2003) was a British radio and television writer, who provided material for numerous comedians including Frankie Howerd, Terry Scott and Morecambe and Wise.

Born in Golders Green, the son of musician Percy Merriman, he attended Finchley Catholic High School, where he started writing for Boy Scout magazines and children's annuals. When he left school his first job was as a subeditor on a scout magazine – and he created sketches for the Boy Scout Gang Show. By the early 1940s, he was a caption writer for the Picture Post.

In 1943, he joined the Royal Air Force where he trained as an air gunner/navigator. After the war ended he sold advertising space with the Financial Times, but soon came full-time comedy writing. He wrote, originally with Barry Took and then solo, the radio series Beyond Our Ken, starring Kenneth Horne. He also was a writer for several Terry Scott vehicles, Scott on... and Happy Ever After. With his son Andy, he co-wrote the radio sitcom series Minor Adjustment (broadcast on BBC Radio 4 in 1996), based on Andy's bringing up of his then four-year-old daughter, Sarah (who appeared in the series), with Down syndrome.

Merriman died in June 2003, aged 78.

He was cremated on 10 June 2003 at Golders Green Crematorium. His ashes lie in section 3-M of the Garden of Remembrance. There is no memorial.

References

External links

The Guardian Obituary

1924 births
2003 deaths
English comedy writers
British television writers
Royal Air Force personnel of World War II
Place of death missing
People from Golders Green
People educated at Finchley Grammar School
20th-century screenwriters